Margaromma is a spider genus of the jumping spider family, Salticidae. The eight described species occur mostly in Australia and New Zealand, with several other species on Pacific islands. One species (M. nitidum) is found in Cameroon.

M. spatiosum from Sarawak has not been studied since its first description in 1907. It reaches a body length of about 5 mm. M. spatiosum has a high cephalothorax, with a flattish area just behind the rear eyes. The eye region is black, the rear part dark red, with white bands around the sides. The abdomen is almost circular and truncated at the front. It is brown, much lighter than the cephalothorax, with some red and white hairs. The legs are brown, with darker front legs. Murphy & Murphy (2000) cast some doubt if the species really belongs to Margaromma.

Name
The genus name is probably derived from Ancient Greek words for pearl and eye. There has been some confusion as to the grammatical gender of this genus, with some authors considering it neuter, and others female, resulting in different endings of species names.

Species
, the World Spider Catalog accepted the following species:
 Margaromma doreyanum (Walckenaer, 1837) – New Guinea
 Margaromma funestum Keyserling, 1882 – Queensland, New South Wales
 Margaromma imperiosum Szombathy, 1915 – New Guinea
 Margaromma namukana Roewer, 1944 – Fiji
 Margaromma nitidum Thorell, 1899 – Cameroon
 Margaromma obscurum (Keyserling, 1882) – Queensland
 Margaromma soligena Simon, 1901 – New Guinea
 Margaromma spatiosum Peckham & Peckham, 1907 – Borneo

M. albertisi and M. marginatum were transferred to genus Zenodorus in 1991.
M. insultans, M. semirasum, M. sexuale and M. torquatum are now placed in Omoedus.

References

External links
 Salticidae.org: Diagnostic drawings of several Margaromma species

Salticidae
Spiders of Oceania
Spiders of Africa
Salticidae genera
Taxa named by Eugen von Keyserling